Kyle Jared Martin (born January 18, 1991) is an American former professional baseball pitcher. He has previously played for the Boston Red Sox of the Major League Baseball (MLB), and for the Saitama Seibu Lions of the Nippon Professional Baseball (NPB). Listed at 6' 7", 230 lb., he bats and throw right-handed.

Career

Boston Red Sox
Martin signed after being selected by the Red Sox in the ninth round of the 2013 MLB Draft out of Texas A&M University. He previously had been selected by the Chicago White Sox (2012) and Washington Nationals (2009) but chose not to sign. Martin was scouted with a three-pitch repertoire that included a 92–94 mph fastball with above-average control, complemented with an 83-86 mph slider, and a 79–82 mph circle changeup that he has the confidence to throw in any count.

In a span of two seasons (2013 and 2014) with three teams, Martin was the first pitcher in the Red Sox 2013 draft class to reach the Double-A level. In his three stints, he posted a collective 8–7 record with a 3.16 ERA and 13 saves in 54 relief appearances, striking out 112 batters while walking 26 in  innings of work before joining the Portland Sea Dogs. Martin suffered setbacks and struggled through injuries in the 2015 midseason, spending two months on the disabled list. He recovered late in the year and was assigned to the Arizona Fall League, where his fastball touched , with some arm-side run, and garnered a promotion to Triple-A Pawtucket Red Sox in 2016.

In 2016, Martin posted a 3–4 record with a 3.38 ERA and six saves while striking out 78 hitters and walking 21, to compile a 3.71 SO/W in  innings. He also recorded a WHIP of 1.19 and was second among International League relievers with 10.53 strikeouts per nine innings. After the 2016 season, Martin was rated as the Red Sox's No. 22 prospect, according to MLB.com, and the Red Sox added him to their 40-man roster. Martin made his Major League debut on July 20, 2017. He was designated for assignment on September 5, 2017, removing him from the 40-man roster. Martin was released on July 25, 2018, to pursue an opportunity to play in Japan.

Saitama Seibu Lions
On July 26, 2018, it was announced that Martin had signed with the Saitama Seibu Lions of the Nippon Professional Baseball (NPB).

On October 30, 2019, Martin was claimed waiver from Lions. On November 5, 2019, he became a free agent.

Sugar Land Skeeters
On March 5, 2020, Martin signed with the Sugar Land Skeeters of the Atlantic League of Professional Baseball. He became a free agent after the season.

References

External links
 
Texas A&M Aggies bio

1991 births
Living people
American expatriate baseball players in Japan
Baseball players from Austin, Texas
Boston Red Sox players
Greenville Drive players
Gulf Coast Red Sox players
Lowell Spinners players
Major League Baseball pitchers
Nippon Professional Baseball pitchers
Pawtucket Red Sox players
Portland Sea Dogs players
Saitama Seibu Lions players
Salem Red Sox players
Scottsdale Scorpions players
Texas A&M Aggies baseball players